An Il-bom (born 2 December 1990) is a North Korean football midfielder presently playing for April 25 in the DPR Korea Premier Football League.

Career
In the season 2009–10 he played with FK Radnički 1923 in the Serbian League West (national third tier) along with his compatriots Ri Kwang-il and Myong Cha-hyon. They all came from Sobaeksu.

He made his debut for the North Korea national football team in 2010. He was part of the squad at the 2013 EAFF East Asian Cup.

He earlier had been part of the North Korea national under-17 football team at the 2006 AFC U-17 Championship and then at the 2007 FIFA U-17 World Cup where he was the team capitan. He played all four games of his team and scored one goal. Then he was part of the North Korean squad at the 2008 AFC U-19 Championship.

An returned to North Korea to play with April 25, wearing number 10. He scored both goals in the final of the 2016 edition of the Hwaebul Cup against Hwaebul, the first in the 9th minute, and the second on a penalty in the 13th minute. The score was 2–2 after extra time, and April 25 went on to win the match 3–2 on penalties.

Honours
Radnički Kragujevac
Serbian League West: 2009–10

April 25
DPR Korea Premier Football League: 2015, 2017, 2017–18

References

External links

An Il-bom at DPRKFootball

1990 births
Living people
Sportspeople from Pyongyang
North Korean footballers
North Korea international footballers
Association football midfielders
Sobaeksu Sports Club players
FK Radnički 1923 players
Expatriate footballers in Serbia